Star Trek: Ex Machina  is a novel based on characters from Star Trek: The Original Series (TOS) and Star Trek: The Motion Picture (TMP). The story is set shortly after the events of the movie, and also acts as a sequel to the episode "For the World Is Hollow and I Have Touched the Sky".

It was written by Christopher L. Bennett and published by Pocket Books in December 2004.

Synopsis

The plot concerns several crew members' efforts to deal with the aftereffects of the V'Ger entity and the long-term ripples of overthrowing a computer intelligence on Yonada so many years ago.

Reviews

The writers of the 2009 Star Trek film cite the book as one of their favorites.

References

External links
Author's Annotations

2004 American novels
Novels based on Star Trek: The Original Series